Esther Helton (November 6, 1961) is an American politician and a Republican member of the Tennessee House of Representatives, representing District 30 since November 6, 2018. Helton represents District 30 In Tennessee which includes; East Ridge, East Brainerd, Apison, and Collegedale.

Background 
Helton was born in East Ridge, Tennessee in 1961. Helton had a medical background prior to politics, serving as a nurse for 35 years.

Education 
Helton attended and received her degree from Chattanooga State Community College for Practical Nursing in 1981.

2018 Election 
The following are the results for the 2018 District 30 Election.

Current Legislative Committees 
Helton currently serves as the Vice-chair for the Health Committee and is a member of the Facilities, Li-censure, and Regulation Subcommittee, Property and Planning Subcommittee, and the Local Committee.

Current Caucus/Non-Legislative Committees 
Helton is a current member of the Tennessee House of Representatives Health and Local Committees.

Civic Memberships 

Member of Elks Lodge 91 East Brainerd

Religion 
Helton is a Baptist who is active in worship at Grace Works Church.

References 

1961 births
Living people
21st-century American politicians
Republican Party members of the Tennessee House of Representatives
Women state legislators in Tennessee
21st-century American women politicians